The 25th Annual GMA Dove Awards were held on April 28, 1994, recognizing accomplishments of musicians for the year 1993. The show was held at the Grand Ole Opry House in Nashville, Tennessee, and was hosted by Amy Grant.

Award recipients

Artists
Artist of the Year
Michael English
New Artist of the Year
Point of Grace
Group of the Year
4Him
Male Vocalist of the Year
Michael English
Female Vocalist of the Year
Twila Paris
Songwriter of the Year
Steven Curtis Chapman
Producer of the Year
Wayne Kirkpatrick

Songs
Song of the Year
“In Christ Alone”; Shawn Craig, Donald Koch
Rap/Hip Hop Recorded Song of the Year
"Socially Acceptable"; Free at Last; dc Talk
Rock Recorded Song of the Year
"Jesus Is Just Alright"; Free at Last; dc Talk
Pop/Contemporary Recorded Song of the Year
“Go There With You”; The Great Adventure; Steven Curtis Chapman
Hard Music Recorded Song of the Year
“Psychedelic Super Jesus”; Snakes in the Playground; Bride
Southern Gospel Recorded Song of the Year
"Satisfied"; The Gaither Vocal Band
Inspirational Recorded Song of the Year
"Holding Out Hope To You"; Hope; Michael English
Country Recorded Song of the Year
"There But for the Grace of God"; Love Is Strong; Paul Overstreet
Traditional Gospel Recorded Song of the Year
"Why We Sing"; Kirk Franklin and the Family; Kirk Franklin
Contemporary Gospel Recorded Song of the Year
"Sold Out"; Start All Over; Helen Baylor

Albums
Rock Album of the Year
Wake-Up Call; Petra
Pop/Contemporary Album of the Year
Hope; Michael English
Hard Music Album of the Year
Tamplin; Ken Tamplin
Contemporary Gospel Album of the Year
Start All Over; Helen Baylor
Traditional Gospel Album of the Year
Kirk Franklin and the Family; Kirk Franklin
Inspirational Album of the Year
The Season of Love; 4Him
Southern Gospel Album of the Year
Southern Classics; Gaither Vocal Band
Country Album of the Year
Walk On; Bruce Carroll
Instrumental Album of the Year
Psalms, Hymns, & Spiritual Songs; Kurt Kaiser
Praise & Worship Album of the Year
Songs from the Loft; Susan Ashton, Gary Chapman, Ashley Cleveland, Amy Delaine, Amy Grant, Kim Hill, Michael James, Wes King, Donna McElroy, and Michael W. Smith
Children's Music Album of the Year
Come to the Cradle; Michael Card
Musical Album
God with Us; Don Moen, Tom Fettke, Tom Hartley, Jack Hayford, and Camp Kirkland
Choral Collection Album
Al Denson Youth Chorus Book, Vol. III; Dave Spear and Al Denson
Recorded Music Packaging of the Year
The Wonder Years 1983-1993; Michael W. Smith

Videos
Long Form Music Video of the Year
The Great Adventure; Steven Curtis Chapman
Short Form Music Video of the Year
"Hand on My Shoulder"; Sandi Patti

References
, official winners list by year

GMA Music Awards
GMA Dove Awards
GMA Dove Awards
1994 in American music
GMA